Langseth is a surname. Notable people with the surname include:

Haavard Langseth (1888–1968), Norwegian political activist 
Hans Langseth (1846–1927), Norwegian-American who held the record for the world's longest beard
Keith Langseth (born 1938), American politician
Lisa Langseth (born 1975), Swedish screenwriter and film director